Tsatsiki, morsan och polisen is a Swedish film directed by Ella Lemhagen which was released to cinemas in Sweden on 1 October 1999, based on the books about Tsatsiki written by Moni Nilsson-Brännström. It won the 1999 Guldbagge Award for Best Film and the 2000 Poznan Silver Goats award for Best Foreign Feature Movie at 18th Ale Kino! International Young Audience Film Festival.

The film was followed by the film Tsatsiki – vänner för alltid.

Cast
Samuel Haus as Tsatsiki
Alexandra Rapaport as Tsatsiki's mother
Jacob Ericksson as Göran
Jonas Karlsson as Niklas
George Nakas as Tsatsiki's father
Sam Kessel as Per Hammar
Isa Engström as Maria Grynwall
Minken Fosheim as teacher
Henric Holmberg as headmaster
Marcus Hasselborg as Mårten
Maria Hazell as Sara
Kasper Lindström as Wille
Maria Bonnevie as Elin
Helge Jordal as Mårten's father
Christina Stenius as Woman in clothes shop
Lena B. Eriksson as Maria Grynwall's mother

References

External links
 
 

Swedish children's films
1999 films
Best Film Guldbagge Award winners
Films whose director won the Best Director Guldbagge Award
Films directed by Ella Lemhagen
Films based on multiple works of a series
Films based on children's books
Films shot in Crete
1990s Swedish films